Waitzia is a genus of Australian plants in the tribe Gnaphalieae within the family Asteraceae. The genus is native to Australia, where it grows in Western Australia, the Northern Territory, New South Wales, Victoria and South Australia.

Species
 Waitzia acuminata Steetz - orange immortelle
 Waitzia corymbosa J.C.Wendl.
 Waitzia nitida (Lindl.) Paul G.Wilson - golden waitzia
 Waitzia podolepis (Gaudich.) Benth. 
 Waitzia suaveolens (Benth.) Druce - fragrant waitzia

formerly included
see Haptotrichion, Pterochaeta & Rhodanthe 
 Waitzia citrina - Rhodanthe citrina 
 Waitzia conica - Haptotrichion conicum 
 Waitzia paniculata - Pterochaeta paniculata 
 Waitzia steetziana - Rhodanthe citrina

References

External links
Australian Plant Name Index: Waitzia
Western Australian Herbarium - FloraBase: Waitzia Department of Environment and Conservation

 
Endemic flora of Australia
Asteraceae genera